Josh Duncan (born May 12, 1986) is an American professional basketball player for Chiba Jets Funabashi of the Japanese B.League.

College career
After playing high school basketball at Moeller High School, in Cincinnati, Ohio, Duncan played 4 seasons of college basketball for Xavier University.

Professional career
Duncan went undrafted in the 2008 NBA draft. In July 2008, he signed his first professional contract with Élan Béarnais Pau-Orthez of France.

In July 2009, he signed with Liège Basket of Belgium. With them he won the Belgian Basketball Supercup in 2009.

From 2010 to 2012 Duncan played with Maccabi Ashdod of the Israeli Basketball Super League. In June 2012, he signed with another Israeli team Hapoel Jerusalem.

On July 2, 2014, Duncan signed a two-year deal with the German team Brose Baskets. On July 7, 2015, he left Brose and returned to Hapoel Jerusalem.

On July 4, 2016, Duncan signed with Eskişehir Basket of the Turkish Basketball First League. On July 20, 2017, he re-signed with Eskişehir for one more season.

References

External links
Josh Duncan at eurobasket.com
Josh Duncan at fiba.com
Josh Duncan at realgm.com

1986 births
Living people
American expatriate basketball people in Belgium
American expatriate basketball people in France
American expatriate basketball people in Germany
American expatriate basketball people in Israel
American expatriate basketball people in Japan
American expatriate basketball people in Turkey
American men's basketball players
Basketball players from Cincinnati
Brose Bamberg players
Chiba Jets Funabashi players
Élan Béarnais players
Eskişehir Basket players
Hapoel Jerusalem B.C. players
Liège Basket players
Maccabi Ashdod B.C. players
Xavier Musketeers men's basketball players
Power forwards (basketball)